FC Roda Moscow was a Russian football team from Moscow. It played professionally in 1996 and 1997. Their best result was 5th place in Zone 3 of the Russian Third League in 1997.

External links
  Team history at KLISF

Association football clubs established in 1995
Association football clubs disestablished in 1998
Defunct football clubs in Moscow
1995 establishments in Russia
1998 disestablishments in Russia